Haddington Hill (also called Wendover Hill) is a hill in The Chilterns, and the highest point in the English county of Buckinghamshire. On the north-eastern flank is Coombe Hill, not to be confused with another Coombe Hill  to the south-west.

Haddington Hill is owned by the Forestry Commission, whose Wendover Woods cover much of the hill. Many tracks run through the forest, and a car park is located near the summit among the trees: the flat summit means the precise location of the highest point is difficult to determine with certainty. However, in the woods to the east of the car park there are a series of large stones bearing the inscription 'The Chiltern Summit'. The stones are surrounded by trees.

Ascents
The peak is accessible by road, with a car park near the stone.  It is also possible to climb on foot.

Pavis Wood

See also
 List of Marilyns in England

References 

Hills of Buckinghamshire
Marilyns of England
Chiltern Hills
Highest points of English counties